Bunting's thicket rat (Grammomys buntingi) is a species of rodent in the family Muridae.
It is found in Ivory Coast, Guinea, Liberia, Senegal, and Sierra Leone.
Its natural habitats are subtropical or tropical moist lowland forests and subtropical or tropical moist shrubland.

References

Grammomys
Rodents of Africa
Mammals described in 1911
Taxonomy articles created by Polbot
Taxa named by Oldfield Thomas